The Syracuse Metropolitan Statistical Area, as defined by the United States Census Bureau, is an area consisting of three counties in central New York, anchored by the city of Syracuse. As of the 2010 census, the MSA had a population of 662,577.  In the 2000 census, the MSA had a population of 650,154.

Counties
Onondaga
Oswego
Madison

Communities

Places with more than 75,000 inhabitants
Syracuse (Principal city)

Places with 25,000 to 75,000 inhabitants
 Cicero (town)
 Clay (town)
 DeWitt (town)
 Manlius (town)
 Salina (town)

Places with 5,000 to 25,000 inhabitants

Baldwinsville (village)
Camillus (town)
Cazenovia (town)
Constantia (town)
Elbridge (town) 
Fairmount (census-designated place)
Fulton (city)
Geddes (town)
Granby (town)
Hamilton (town)
Hastings (town)
Lenox (town)
Lysander (town)
Marcellus (town)
Mattydale (census-designated place) 

Mexico (town)
North Syracuse (village)
Oneida (city)
Onondaga (town)
Oswego (town)
Oswego (city)
Pompey (town)
Richland (town)
Schroeppel (town)
Scriba (town)
Skaneateles (town)
Solvay (village)
Sullivan (town)
Van Buren (town)
Volney (town)
Westvale (census-designated place)

Places with 1,000 to 5,000 inhabitants

Albion (town)
Amboy (town)
Borodino 
Brewerton (census-designated place)
Bridgeport (census-designated place)
Brookfield (town)
Camillus (village)
Canastota (village)
Cazenovia (village)
Central Square (village)
Chittenango (village)
Constantia (census-designated place)
DeRuyter (town)
East Syracuse (village)
Eaton (town)
Elbridge (village)
Fabius (town) 
Fayetteville (village) 
Fenner (town)

Galeville (census-designated place) 
Hamilton (village)
Hannibal (town)
Jordan (village) 
LaFayette (town)
Lakeland (census-designated place) 
Lebanon (town)
Lincoln (town)
Liverpool (village) 
Lyncourt (census-designated place) 
Madison (town)
Manlius (village) 
Marcellus (village) 
Mexico (village)
Minetto (census-designated place)
Minetto (town)
Minoa (village) 
Morrisville (village)
Nedrow (census-designated place) 

Nelson (town)
New Haven (town)
Onondaga Reservation
Orwell (town)
Otisco (town)
Palermo (town)
Parish (town) 
Phoenix (village)
Pulaski (village)
Sandy Creek (town)
Seneca Knolls (census-designated place) 
Skaneateles (village)
Smithfield (town)
Spafford (town)
Stockbridge (town)
Tully (town)
Village Green (census-designated place)
West Monroe (town)
Williamstown (town)

Places with less than 1,000 inhabitants
Altmar (village)
Boylston (town)
Cleveland (village)
DeRuyter (village)
Earlville (village; partial)
Fabius (village)
Georgetown (town)
Hannibal (village)
Lacona (village)
Madison (village)
Munnsville (village)
Parish (village)
Redfield (town)
Sand Ridge (census-designated place)
Sandy Creek (village)
Tully (village)
Wampsville (village)

Hamlets

Cardiff 
Fruit Valley
Hinmansville
Jack's Reef 
Jamesville 
Leonardsville
Memphis 
Messina Springs 
Mottville 
Mycenae 

Onondaga Hill 
Pennellville
Plainville 
Shepard Settlement 
South Spafford 
Spafford Valley 
Split Rock 
Taunton 
Texas
West Edmeston (partial)

Demographics

As of the census of 2000, there were 650,154 people, 252,043 households, and 164,202 families residing within the MSA. The racial makeup of the MSA was 88.36% White, 6.87% African American, 0.74% Native American, 1.61% Asian, 0.03% Pacific Islander, 0.74% from other races, and 1.65% from two or more races. Hispanic or Latino of any race were 2.08% of the population.

The median income for a household in the MSA was $39,210, and the median income for a family was $47,862. Males had a median income of $35,698 versus $25,373 for females. The per capita income for the MSA was $19,098.

Combined Statistical Area

The Syracuse–Auburn Combined Statistical Area is made up of four counties in central New York. The statistical area includes one metropolitan area and one micropolitan area. As of 2014 population estimates, the CSA had a population of 742,603.

Metropolitan Statistical Areas (MSAs)
Syracuse (Onondaga, Oswego, and Madison counties)
Micropolitan Statistical Areas (μSAs)
Auburn (Cayuga County)

Sports

Current teams

Professional teams in Syracuse include:
 Syracuse Mets (International League affiliate of the New York Mets) Stadium: NBT Bank Stadium
 Syracuse Crunch (American Hockey League affiliate of the Tampa Bay Lightning) Arena: War Memorial at Oncenter

College teams in Syracuse include:
 Syracuse University Orange (NCAA Division I-A) Stadium: JMA Wireless Dome
 Le Moyne College Dolphins (NCAA Division II)
 Onondaga Community College Lazers (NJCAA)
 SUNY Environmental Science and Forestry Mighty Oaks (USCAA)

Syracuse University sports are by far the most attended sporting events in the Syracuse area. Basketball games often draw over 30,000 fans, and football games over 40,000. The university has bred dozens of famous professional players since starting an athletics program in the late nineteenth century, including all-time greats Jim Brown, Larry Csonka and Dave Bing, and present professional stars Marvin Harrison, Carmelo Anthony, Dwight Freeney, Jason Hart, and Donovan McNabb. Both teams play in the JMA Dome.

Colleges and universities

Syracuse
Syracuse University
SUNY Upstate Medical University
SUNY-ESF
SUNY Oswego Metro Center
Pomeroy College of Nursing at Crouse Hospital
St. Joseph's College of Nursing
Elsewhere in Onondaga County
Le Moyne College in DeWitt
Onondaga Community College in Onondaga Hill
Bryant & Stratton College has campuses in Liverpool and Syracuse
Columbia College has a campus at Hancock Field in Salina
Empire State College has a campus in East Syracuse
Madison County
Colgate University in Hamilton
Cazenovia College in Cazenovia
Morrisville State College in Morrisville
Oswego County
SUNY Oswego in Fulton, Oswego, and Phoenix

Notable persons 

Several well-known individuals have ties to the Syracuse metropolitan area, including:

 L. Frank Baum – author of The Wonderful Wizard of Oz; born in Chittenango, New York
 Joey Belladonna – singer of heavy metal band Anthrax; born Joseph Belardini in Oswego, New York
 Grover Cleveland – two-term United States President; childhood resident of Fayetteville, New York
 Robin Curtis – actress of Star Trek films, resident of Cazenovia, New York
 Matilda Joslyn Gage – 19th century Fayetteville, New York feminist
 Gym Class Heroes – band from Geneva, New York
 Beezie Madden – Olympic Gold Medal Equestrian Show Jumper, resident of Cazenovia, New York
 Dave Mirra – professional BMX bike rider, former resident of Chittenango, New York
 Jonathan Murray – American television producer, born in Fayetteville, New York
 Eliza Orlins – contestant on Survivor: Vanuatu, Survivor: Micronesia, and The Amazing Race 31
 Leland Stanford – founder of Stanford University; graduate of Cazenovia Seminary
 David Foster Wallace – author, born in Ithaca, New York
 Bobcat Goldthwait – Actor, comedian, screenwriter, and film and television director born and raised in Syracuse
 Tom Kenny – Actor and comedian, voice of SpongeBob SquarePants (character), born and raised in Syracuse
 John Katko – Four-term Congressman from Camillus, New York, serving the 24th Congressional District

See also
New York census statistical areas
Timeline of town creation in Central New York

References

 
Onondaga County, New York
Oswego County, New York
Madison County, New York